Northern Digital Incorporated is a Canadian medical measurement company founded by Jerry Krist. Based in Waterloo, Ontario, the company started in 1981  at the University of Waterloo. They have offices in Hong Kong and Germany.

Product Lineup 
NDI's Product Lineup includes: Optical Measurement Systems including the Polaris (Flagship Model)  the Optotrak and the Certus HD; Electromagnetic Tracking Systems such as the Aurora and Wave; Laser Trackers (ScanTRAK); and Reflective Marker Spheres which are authorized 'Brainlab' partner utilities.

Medical sector
NDI's primary products are optical measurement systems used in surgery and other medical procedures. The company's primary optical tracking tool, the 'Polaris' is used in many medical procedures including Brain Surgery, Neurosurgery, PET Procedures, Ear Nose & Throat Surgery, Medical Robotics Integration, Spinal Surgery, Computer Assisted Therapy and I.G.R.T. (Image-Guided Radiation Therapy). The company's Wave Speech Research system is able to track minute movements in a child's mouth with the goal of developing better speech therapy protocols, particularly for children whose pathology involves spasticity, such as in cerebral palsy patients.

Industrial sector
NDI has many tracking products designed for industries.

References

Companies based in Waterloo, Ontario
Technology companies of Canada